Dealu Viei or Dealul Viei may refer to several villages in Romania:

 Dealul Viei, a village in Merei Commune, Buzău County
 Dealu Viei, a village in Roșia de Amaradia Commune, Gorj County